Muharrem İnce (born 4 May 1964) is a Turkish physics teacher, school principal, sport executive, and politician. He founded and is leader of the Homeland Party since May 2021. Formerly a four term Republican People's Party (Turkish: Cumhuriyet Halk Partisi, abbreviated CHP) MP for Yalova, his hometown, he also served as the CHP's parliamentary group deputy chairman between June 2010 and August 2014.

İnce has stood for election as CHP chairman twice against current chairman Kemal Kılıçdaroğlu: first in September 2014 following the party's loss in the Turkish presidential election on 18 August 2014, and later in February 2018.

As the presidential candidate of the CHP in the 2018 Turkish presidential election, Ince received just over 30 percent of the votes, placing second behind outright first-round winner Recep Tayyip Erdoğan, with 53 percent.

Biography
İnce was born in the village of Elmalık in the province of Yalova as the son of Şerif and Zekiye İnce. His paternal grandparents originated from modern-day Drama in Greek Macedonia, his maternal grandparents originated from Rize on the Black Sea coast of Anatolia. He graduated from Balıkesir University, Necatibey Faculty of Education, Physics-Chemistry and later worked as a physics teacher and a school principal. Later, he worked as the Head of Press for football club Yalovaspor. He was elected as president of the Atatürkist Thought Association, a secular organization that espouses the ideas of Mustafa Kemal Atatürk, the founder of modern Turkey. He is married to Ülkü with whom he has a son named Salih Arda.

Politics

İnce has been known in Turkish politics as one of the fiercest voices of the main opposition since 2002, against the ruling Justice and Development Party (Turkish: Adalet ve Kalkınma Partisi, abbreviated AKP) of Recep Tayyip Erdoğan. He became well known through his speeches which were widely shared on the internet .

He was re-elected in 2011 and 2013 and before resigning in August 2014. He was replaced by Levent Gök.
On 30 March 2014, Turkey held  local elections, and the elections in Yalova were won narrowly by İnce's party, the CHP. However, the elections in Yalova were to be contested again. İnce played a crucial role in the process and the CHP's candidate, Vefa Salman, won the second election as well. On 18 August 2014, İnce declared his candidacy for CHP chairmanship but lost the scrutiny during the 18th Republican People's Party Extraordinary Convention in September 2014.

He once again stood against Kılıçdaroğlu for party leadership in the 36th CHP Ordinary Convention in February 2018, but his bid once again was unsuccessful. He received 447 votes from delegates, as opposed to Kılıçdaroğlu's 790 votes.

İnce was revealed to be the presidential candidate of the Republican People's Party (CHP) on 3 May 2018. The following day, party leader Kemal Kılıçdaroğlu formally proclaimed the CHP's support for İnce and his candidacy was formally announced. Shortly thereafter, the CHP began preparations for the campaign season, launching the production of campaign materials and merchandise. It was revealed in early May that İnce's campaign would adopt the slogan “Türkiye’ye güvence Muharrem İnce”, roughly translating to "Muharrem İnce, an assurance to Turkey", and that it would be kicked off with an election rally in his home city of Yalova on 5 May.

President Erdoğan subsequently beat İnce in the first round of the presidential election, receiving 52.6% of votes. İnce received 30.64% of votes.

After the 37th CHP Ordinary Convention, it was claimed that İnce would be founding a new political party, called the National Party, in September. He founded his political platform named the Homeland Movement on September 4, 2020, while still being a member of the Republican People's Party. İnce announced his resignation from the Republican Peoples' Party on 31 January 2021, and formally resigned on 8 February of the same year.

In February 2023, Muharrem İnce, the leader of the Homeland Party announced that his party is discussing an electoral alliance with the Democratic Left Party, the Victory Party, True Party and the Justice Party for the 2023 Turkish general election. On 6 March 2023, Muharrem İnce left the 4-party alliance negotiations by sending a message to their WhatsApp group.

See also 

 2018 Muharrem İnce presidential campaign

References

External links

 Official Twitter
 Profile at the Turkish Grand National Assembly website

1964 births
Living people
Deputies of Yalova
Contemporary Republican People's Party (Turkey) politicians
Members of the 22nd Parliament of Turkey
Members of the 23rd Parliament of Turkey
Members of the 24th Parliament of Turkey
Members of the 25th Parliament of Turkey
Members of the 26th Parliament of Turkey
Turkish political party founders